Traverso, a.k.a. baroque flute, indicates the baroque to mid 19-century wooden transverse flute that preceded the Western concert flute.

Traverso may also indicate:
 transverse flute, English translation of the Italian word traverso
 Traverso DAW  a cross-platform multitrack audio recording and audio editing suite
 Giovanni Battista Traverso – Italian mycologist